Shooter is an American drama television series based on the 2007 film of the same name and the first three novels in the Bob Lee Swagger series by Stephen Hunter. The show stars Ryan Phillippe in the lead role of Swagger, a retired United States Marine Corps Scout Sniper from MARSOC living in seclusion who is coaxed back into action after learning of a plot to kill the President. USA Network picked up the pilot in August 2015 and ordered the series in February 2016.

The series was originally set to premiere on July 19, 2016, but it was postponed to July 26 due to the July 7 Dallas police officer shootings. USA pulled it entirely after the Baton Rouge police officer shootings on July 17. On October 3, 2016, USA announced that the new premiere date for Shooter would be November 15, 2016. On December 19, 2016, the series was renewed for a second season that premiered on July 18, 2017. On December 4, 2017, the series was renewed for a third season.

On August 15, 2018, USA Network canceled Shooter after three seasons, and its final episode aired on September 13, 2018.

Cast and characters

Main

 Ryan Phillippe as Bob Lee Swagger, a highly trained, retired Marine Gunnery Sergeant and MARSOC Scout Sniper
 Shantel VanSanten as Julie Swagger, Bob Lee's wife
Cynthia Addai-Robinson as Nadine Memphis, an FBI agent investigating Swagger
 Omar Epps as Isaac Johnson, a Secret Service Agent who is also a former Marine Captain and was Swagger's commanding officer in MARSOC
 Eddie McClintock as Jack Payne, a figure involved in the conspiracy against Swagger (season 1; guest, season 3)
 Josh Stewart as Solotov, a Chechen master sniper with whom Bob Lee has tangled before (seasons 2–3)
 Jesse Bradford as Harris Downey, a D.C. staffer who was once involved with Nadine (recurring, season 2; main, season 3)
 Gerald McRaney as Red Bama Sr., owner of Bama Cattle and an Undersecretary in the Department of Agriculture (season 3)

Recurring

 David Andrews as Sam Vincent, Bob Lee's close friend and lawyer. (season 1, 3)
 David Marciano as Howard Utey, Nadine Memphis' superior at the FBI (season 1)
Lexy Kolker as Mary Swagger, Bob Lee's and Julie's daughter
 William Fichtner as Rathford O'Brien, Bob Lee's former shooting instructor
 Tom Sizemore as Hugh Meachum, a CIA black ops operative with mysterious motives (season 1)
 Rob Brown as Donny Fenn, Swagger's best friend and spotter who was killed by Solotov (seasons 1–2)
 Sean Cameron Michael as Grigory Krukov, a Russian FSB agent (season 1)
 Delaina Mitchell as Anna Wallingford, Julie's married sister and Mary's aunt (season 1, 3)
 David Chisum as Jim Wallingford, Anna's husband and Julie's brother in law (season 1)
 Michelle Krusiec as Lin Johnson, Isaac's loyal wife (season 1-2)
 Matt Shallenberger as John Wheeler, a mysterious and deadly Atlas operative (guest: season 1, recurring: season 3)
 Desmond Harrington as Lon Scott, the CEO of Anhur Dynamics (season 1)
 Beverly D'Angelo as Patricia Gregson, a former National Security Advisor
 Jerry Ferrara as Kirk Zehnder, a former marine who always detects a conspiracy and is part of the core team of Bob Lee Swagger (season 2)
 Todd Lowe as Colin Dobbs, a former marine in Swagger's unit, now living in Texas an hour from the Swagger Ranch (season 2)
 Patrick Sabongui as Yusuf Ali, a core member of Swagger's original Marine team (season 2)
 Jaina Lee Ortiz as Angela Tio, an active duty Marine who formerly served with Bob Lee's unit (season 2)
 John Marshall Jones as Sheriff Brown, the local law enforcement in Bob Lee's hometown and a long-time friend (season 2–3)
 Harry Hamlin as Sen. Addison Hayes, a mysterious and powerful mastermind whose agenda will collide with Swagger (seasons 2–3)
 Troy Garity as Jeffrey Denning, a seasoned investigative journalist who cares deeply about justice being served (season 2)
 Derek Phillips as Earl Swagger, Bob Lee's father, a Vietnam veteran who was sheriff in Bob Lee's hometown before he was killed in 1988 (season 3)
 Tait Blum as Young Bob Lee (season 3)
 Conor O'Farrell as Rick Culp, a West Texas prison guard who may have been involved in Earl Swagger's death (season 3)
 Eric Ladin as Red Bama Jr., Red Sr's screw-up of a son who desperately wants his father's respect and confidence (season 3)
 Brian Letscher as Bert Salinger, an employee of Red Bama Sr. who watches over Red Jr. (season 3)
 Felisha Terrell as Carlita Cruise, a former Atlas operative embedded in the Dept. of Agriculture who helps Nadine and Isaac take down her former employers (season 3)
 Mallory Jansen as Margo, an Agent for the Department of Justice who has been attempting to bring down Atlas for years (season 3)
 Kurt Fuller as Andrew Gold, the Deputy Chief of Staff to the U.S. President and high ranking Atlas member (season 3)
 Dee Wallace as Katherine Mansfield, the long-time former mission planner for Atlas who is now forced to reside in a mental institution (season 3)
 Michael O'Neill as Ray Brooks, a Federal judge nominated for a vacancy on the U.S. Supreme Court and Atlas operative (season 3)

Production
On July 6, 2016, while filming a scene at Agua Dulce Airpark, actor Tom Sizemore accidentally ran over a stuntman. Sizemore was supposed to enter the Cadillac Escalade and stay there until the scene ended, but the stunt coordinator told him to pull out, not realizing that the stuntman was behind him.

On July 26, 2017, the second-season episode order was cut back from the planned ten episodes to the eight episodes already filmed after Ryan Phillippe broke his leg on July 16, 2017, in an incident unrelated to the series.

About the cancellation, Omar Epps said: “That was all backdoor politics. It had nothing to do with the numbers. Me and Ryan [Phillippe] had a great time. We were like kids in a candy store. We used to laugh every day we showed up to work, like, 'We're kids again!' We just get to run and jump, push, punch. You know, stuff that little boys do. It was like playing in the playground in the sandbox. I had a great, great time on that show. I have a lot of respect for John Hlavin, who's a showrunner on there. And like I said, Ryan and I got cool and had a great time on that show. That was just the backdoor politics.“

Episodes

Season 1 (2016–17)
Based on the novel Point of Impact by Stephen Hunter.

Season 2 (2017)
Based on the novel Time to Hunt by Stephen Hunter.

Season 3 (2018)
Based on the novel Black Light by Stephen Hunter.

Broadcast
Shooter aired on Thursdays at 10:00pm on USA Network. The episodes are approximately 43 minutes, and are broadcast in both high- and standard definition. In addition, the streaming service Netflix started to broadcast the series in certain regions worldwide, the first season weekly on November 15, 2016, with a one-day delay with respect to the original United States broadcast.

Reception 
Shooter received mixed reviews from critics. On the review aggregator Rotten Tomatoes, the series has an approval rating of 47% based on 17 reviews, with an average rating of 5.75/10. The site's critical consensus reads: "Ryan Phillippe's efforts aren't enough to salvage Shooter, a tedious, under-developed drama that lacks an original voice or perspective." On Metacritic, which assigns a normalized rating, the series has a score 60 out of 100, based on 11 critics, indicating "mixed or average reviews".

Ratings

Season 1 (2016–17)

Season 2 (2017)

Season 3 (2018)

References

External links
 
 
 

2010s American drama television series
2016 American television series debuts
2018 American television series endings
American action television series
American military television series
American thriller television series
English-language television shows
Live action television shows based on films
Snipers in fiction
Television series based on adaptations
Television series by Paramount Television
Television series by Universal Content Productions
Television shows based on American novels
USA Network original programming